Aliquot may refer to:

Mathematics
Aliquot part, a proper divisor of an integer
Aliquot sum, the sum of the aliquot parts of an integer
Aliquot sequence, a sequence of integers in which each number is the aliquot sum of the previous number

Music
Aliquot stringing, in stringed instruments, the use of strings which are not struck to make a note, but which resonate sympathetically with struck notes
Aliquot stop, an organ stop that adds harmonics or overtones instead of the primary pitch

Sciences
Aliquot of a sample, in chemistry or the other sciences, an exact portion of a sample or total amount of a liquid (e.g. exactly 25 mL of water taken from 250 ml)
Aliquot in pharmaceutics, a method of measuring ingredients below the sensitivity of a scale by proportional dilution with inactive known ingredients
Genome aliquoting, the problem of reconstructing an ancestral genome from the genomes of polyploid descendants

Other uses
Aliquot part, in the US Public Land Survey System, a subdivision of a section based upon an even division by distances along the edges and not by equal area